Juan Gesualdi (born 30 June 1929) was an Argentine equestrian. He competed in two events at the 1964 Summer Olympics.

References

External links
 

1929 births
Possibly living people
Argentine male equestrians
Olympic equestrians of Argentina
Equestrians at the 1964 Summer Olympics
Place of birth missing (living people)